"Not Just Another Girl" is the first single from Ivan Neville's debut solo album If My Ancestors Could See Me Now, the song reached number 26 on the Billboard Hot 100 chart. The song was featured on the soundtrack to the film My Stepmother Is an Alien.

References

1988 singles
American rhythm and blues songs
American pop rock songs
1988 songs
Polydor Records singles